George Charles Roche III (May 16, 1935 – May 5, 2006) was the 11th president of Hillsdale College, serving from 1971 to 1999. He was led to resign following a scandal surrounding an alleged sexual affair between Roche and his daughter-in-law, Lissa Jackson Roche, and her subsequent suicide.

Roche received his bachelor's degree from Regis College (now Regis University) in 1956.  He later received a masters and Ph.D. from the University of Colorado.

Prior to becoming president of Hillsdale College Roche was a professor at the Colorado School of Mines.  He also worked with the Foundation for Economic Education.

The Center for Constructive Alternatives seminar program and the college's widely circulated speech digest, Imprimis, were started during Roche's years as college president. Under his leadership, many new buildings were constructed, including a sports complex that bears his name. Roche authored many books, such as Legacy of Freedom, The Bewildered Society, and The Book of Heroes, although it is believed that Lissa Roche, his daughter-in-law who worked at the college, was the ghostwriter of his later books. In the case of The Book of Heroes, Lissa is sometimes listed as a co-author and is acknowledged as a major contributor in its introduction.

Ronald Reagan appointed Roche chairman of the National Council on Educational Research in 1984.

The scandal broke out in 1999 when Lissa Jackson Roche claimed to have had an affair spanning 19 years with George Roche III, her husband's father. She threatened suicide, and her husband found her in the college arboretum with a handgun and her blood still warm, but was unable to prevent her self-inflicted death. Roche resigned in November 1999 and left public life. The widely publicized scandal brought national attention to Roche and Hillsdale. The 2000 book Hillsdale: Greek Tragedy in America's Heartland explores the events and questions whether Lissa Roche's death was actually suicide. Roche denied Lissa's allegations.

After the scandal Roche moved to a remote cabin in Colorado. He visited Michigan briefly in 2005 to celebrate his 70th birthday. He died on May 5, 2006, in Louisville, Kentucky.

Bibliography
 "American Federalism" (1967, Foundation for Economic Education)
 Legacy of Freedom (1969)
 Education in America (1969)
 

 The Bewildered Society (1972)
 The Balancing Act: Quota Hiring in Higher Education (1974)
 Federal Assault on Independent Education (1979)
 America by the Throat: The Stranglehold of Federal Bureaucracy (1983)
 Going Home (1986)
 A World Without Heroes: The Modern Tragedy (1987)
 A Reason for Living (1989)
 The Fall of the Ivory Tower: Government Funding, Corruption, and the Bankrupting of American Higher Education (1994)
 The Book of Heroes: Great Men and Women in American History (1998)

References

 Ellis, Jonathon "Sex, lies and suicide" Salon Jan 19, 2000.
 Michaelsen, Mark G. "Remembering George Roche" The American Spectator May 12, 2006.
 Miller, John J. "Horror at Hillsdale" National Review Nov. 12, 1999.
 Van der Werf, Martin.  “A Scandal and a Suicide Leave a College Reeling,”  Chronicle of Higher Education, November 19, 1999. Sub-title: “Hillsdale president quits amid rumors of affair with his daughter-in-law, who killed herself.”
Ronald Reagan papers nominations listings for March 8, 1984

1935 births
2006 deaths
Regis University alumni
University of Colorado alumni
Colorado School of Mines faculty
Heads of universities and colleges in the United States
Hillsdale College people
20th-century American academics